Terje Sandkjær (born 24 February 1944 in Landvik) is a Norwegian politician for the Centre Party.

He was elected to the Norwegian Parliament from Aust-Agder in 1993, but was not re-elected in 1997.

Sandkjær was a member of the executive committee of Grimstad municipality council during the terms 1991–1993 and 1999–2003.

References

1944 births
Living people
Members of the Storting
Centre Party (Norway) politicians
20th-century Norwegian politicians
People from Grimstad
Aust-Agder politicians